Prosecutor's Office of Georgia is a government institution in Georgia, a legal party responsible for official prosecution in courts. 

As defined by the Constitution of Georgia, amended in 2017 and 2018, the Prosecutor's Office is led by the Prosecutor General (გენერალური პროკურორი), who is elected by the Parliament of Georgia for a term of 6 years. The Prosecutor General's candidacy is nominated by the Prosecutors' Council (საპროკურორო საბჭო), an independent body directly accountable to the Parliament and composed of the Minister of Justice, attorneys, judges, and members of the Parliament as defined by the law. The Council is to ensure the independence, transparency, and efficiency of the Prosecutor's Office.

List of heads of Prosecutor's Office of Georgia

Prosecutor General of Georgia 
 Vakhtang Razmade, 1991–1992
 Vazha Abakelia, 1992
 Tedo Ninidze, 1992–1993
 Jamlet Babilashvili, 1993–2001
 Gia Meparishvili, 1993–2001
 Nugzar Gabrichidze, 30 November 2001 – 14 January 2004
 Irakli Okruashvili, 14 January 2004 – 7 June 2004
 Zurab Adeishvili, 10 June 2004 – 26 April 2007
 Zurab Bibilashvili, 26 April 2007 – 31 January 2008
 Eka Tkeshelashvili, 31 January 2008 – 11 November 2008

Chief Prosecutor of Georgia 
 Mamuka Gvaramia, 11 November 2008 – 28 September 2009
 Murtaz Zodelava, 28 September 2009 – 8 October 2012
 Archil Kbilashvili, 8 October 2012 – 7 November 2013
 Otar Partskhaladze, 7 November 2013 – 30 December 2013
 Irakli Shotadze, acting, 30 December 2013 – 21 January 2014
 Giorgi Badashvili, 21 January 2014 – 19 November 2015
 Irakli Shotadze, 19 November 2015 – 31 May 2018
 Mamuka Vasadze, acting, 31 May 2018 – 16 July 2018

Prosecutor General of Georgia 
 Shalva Tadumadze, 16 July 2018 – 12 December 2019
 Vacant, 12 December 2019 - 18 February 2020
 Irakli Shotadze, 18 February 2020 - present

References

External links 
 Prosecutor's Office of Georgia
 Prosecutors' Council of Georgia 

Government of Georgia (country)
Law of Georgia (country)
Government agencies established in 1992